Villeneuve-sur-Aisne is a commune in the Aisne department in Hauts-de-France in northern France. It is the result of the merger, on 1 January 2019, of the communes of Guignicourt and Menneville. Guignicourt station has rail connections to Reims and Laon.

Population

See also
Communes of the Aisne department

References

Communes of Aisne
Communes nouvelles of Aisne
Populated places established in 2019
2019 establishments in France